The 1992 Donnay Indoor Championships was a men's tennis tournament played on indoor carpet courts at the Forest National in Brussels, Belgium the event was part of the 1992 ATP Tour. It was the 11th and last edition of the tournament and was held from 10 February until 16 February 1992. Third-seeded Boris Becker won the singles title, his second at the event after 1990.

Finals

Singles

 Boris Becker defeated  Jim Courier, 6–7(5–7), 2–6, 7–6(12–10), 7–6(7–5), 7–5
 It was Becker's first singles title of the year, and the 32nd of his career.

Doubles

 Boris Becker /  John McEnroe defeated  Guy Forget /  Jakob Hlasek, 6–3, 6–2

References

Donnay Indoor Championships
Donnay
+